Analog Integrated Circuits and Signal Processing is a monthly peer-reviewed scientific journal that is published by Springer Science+Business Media. It was established in 1991. The editor-in-chief is M. Ismail (Ohio State University). The journal covers original research, fundamental and applied, on integrated circuits used for signal processing. Publishing formats include original research, letters, and tutorials.

Abstracting and indexing
The journal is abstracted and indexed in

External links
 

Springer Science+Business Media academic journals
Publications established in 1991
Engineering journals
English-language journals
Monthly journals